Little Steel Roller Derby (formerly known as the Little Steel Derby Girls) is a women's flat-track roller derby league based in Youngstown, Ohio. Founded in 2008, the league currently consists of two teams which compete against teams from other leagues. Little Steel is a member of the Women's Flat Track Derby Association (WFTDA).

History
The league was founded in December 2008 by Tifany Griffith, known as "Ground Zero". Little Steel won its first bout against a Steel City Derby Demons team, but progress was initially slow and it was only in October 2010 that it was ready to play its first home bout. By early 2011, the league had 24 skaters, and was aiming to join the Women's Flat Track Derby Association (WFTDA).

Little Steel was accepted into the WFTDA Apprentice Program in October 2011, and became a full member of the WFTDA in June 2012.

WFTDA rankings

References

Youngstown, Ohio
Roller derby leagues established in 2008
Roller derby leagues in Ohio
Women's Flat Track Derby Association Division 3